Native Nod was an American emo band formed in the early 1990s and based in the New York metropolitan area. During their short stint as a group, they released nine songs, divided amongst three seven-inch EPs, Bread, Answers, and Lower GI Bleed. These nine songs can be found on the Gern Blandsten Records collection, Today Puberty, Tomorrow The World.

Member Chris Leo moved on to form The Van Pelt and later The Lapse, later performing as "Vague Angels". Dave Lerner joined Ted Leo and the Pharmacists. Chris and Danny Leo are the brothers of Ted Leo. Danny Leo formed The Holy Childhood (stylized as "tHE hOLY cHILDHOOD"). Justin Simon played in We Acediasts while living in Japan before relocating to New York and establishing Mesh-Key Records.

Members 
Chris Leo, vocals
Danny Leo, drums
Dave Lerner, bass
Justin Simon, guitar

Releases
Answers 7" (1992)
Bread 7" (1993)
Lower GI Bleed 7" (1995)
Today Puberty, Tomorrow The World CD (1995)

References

External links 
Gern Blandsten Records

American post-hardcore musical groups
American emo musical groups
First-wave emo bands